On Meaning is a Hebrew political philosophy podcast which examines ideas and philosophers shaping Israeli society today. The podcast was launched in April 2019 by Adv. Tamir Dortal. It has since accumulated over 400,000 downloads and made it to the finals in Geektime website's 2020 competition in the "interviews" category.

Background
Tamir Dortal was interested in Hebrew podcasts on the topics of conservatism, political philosophy, economics and civil liberties. He discovered there were few to none Hebrew podcasts on these topics, and decided to start his own.

Chapters
The podcast addresses issues on Israel's public agenda, including: Civil liberties, Jewish traditions in modern life, Jews and liberal conservatism, family, the welfare state, security, nationalism, Separation of religion and state, European migrant crisis, capitalism, governance, law and democracy, judicial activism, the Middle East and Islamic culture.

Guests have included people such as Yair Kleinbaum and Elhanan Gruner.

Production
On Meaning's team produces other successful podcasts such as: Hashimua ( – The Hearing), Al Hamilhama ( – About the War) and HaMatzbee Menatzeah ( – The warlord wins).

Host
Adv. Dortel received his law degree from the Hebrew University of Jerusalem and interned at the Yehuda Raveh & Co. law firm. He is a social activist, lecturer/professor and civics teacher. Dortal is also a partner at the Tikvah Foundation and director of the Jerusalem-based Exodus Program. He currently teaches economics at the Shalom Hartman Institute.

See also 
 Political podcast

External links

References

Conservative talk radio
English-language radio programs
News podcasts
Political podcasts
Audio podcasts
2019 podcast debuts
Interview podcasts
Jewish podcasts